Zhang Huiqiang (born 14 October 1976) is a Chinese racewalker. He competed in the men's 50 kilometres walk at the 1996 Summer Olympics.

References

1976 births
Living people
Athletes (track and field) at the 1996 Summer Olympics
Chinese male racewalkers
Olympic athletes of China
Place of birth missing (living people)